The 1874 United Kingdom general election in Ireland produced the first major electoral appearance of the Home Rule League under chairman Isaac Butt. The party's electoral success, in which it won 60 MPs, taking control of Irish electoral politics from the previously dominant Conservative and the Liberal parties was, the beginning of a dominance that was to see the party as the Irish Parliamentary Party control the political landscape in Ireland until its wipeout in the 1918 general election.

However its success in 1874 was marred by the lack of unity within the party in the House of Commons, where many of its members in effect sat as Liberal MPs and voted against their own Irish colleagues. It was not until then chairman Charles Stewart Parnell in the early 1880s introduced a strict whip that the party began to exercise serious influence, and act as a unit, at Westminster.

Results

See also
 History of Ireland (1801–1923)

Notes

Sources

References

1874
Ireland
January 1874 events
February 1874 events